The canton of Argentan-1 is an administrative division of the Orne department, northwestern France. It was created at the French canton reorganisation which came into effect in March 2015. Its seat is in Argentan.

It consists of the following communes:
 
Argentan (partly)
Aunou-le-Faucon
Boischampré
Brieux
Commeaux
Juvigny-sur-Orne
Montabard
Moulins-sur-Orne
Nécy
Occagnes
Ri
Rônai
Sai
Sarceaux
Sévigny

References

Cantons of Orne